opened in the Nibutani area of Biratori, Hokkaidō, Japan in 1992. The collection includes 919 items relating to the daily life of the local Ainu that have been jointly designated an Important Tangible Folk Cultural Property; a further 202 items from the same designation may be found at the nearby .

See also

 Historical Museum of the Saru River
 List of Important Tangible Folk Cultural Properties
 List of Historic Sites of Japan (Hokkaidō)
 Hokkaido Museum
 Ainu culture

References

External links
 Nibutani Ainu Culture Museum

Museums in Hokkaido
History of Hokkaido
Museums established in 1992
1992 establishments in Japan
Ainu
Ethnic museums
Biratori, Hokkaido